This group is empty.

See also
Surgical dressings

References

V20